Locust Creek may refer to the following creeks in the United States:

 Locust Creek (Grand River), a stream in Missouri
 Locust Creek (Gravois Creek), a stream in Missouri
 Locust Creek (Shamokin Creek), Pennsylvania
 Locust Creek (West Virginia) - see Locust Creek Covered Bridge (West Virginia)